The Bridgestone Canadian Superbike National Championship (CSBK) is the leading motorcycle road racing superbike championship in Canada. The championship is managed and organized by Professional Motor Sports Productions Inc (PMP) of Toronto, Ontario.  PMP was founded by David Hatch and Colin Fraser in 1994, and is currently managed by Fraser.  PMP is also the television production company for the Bridgestone CSBK Championship Series, with first window broadcast on Canada's TSN - The Sports Network.  The series operates in the summer months, normally between May and August and includes classes for Pro Superbike (1000cc), Pro Sport Bike (middleweight), Amateur Superbike, Amateur Sport Bike, Amateur Lightweight Sport Bike and Pro-AM Lightweight.  The series is affiliated with the MCC -Motorcyclists Confederation of Canada, CMA - Canadian Motorcycle Association and the Canadian Mini Superbike National Championship. 

Bridgestone tires became the title sponsor of the series in September, 2022, for a term of four years: 2023-2026. 

Current bike manufacturers being raced in the series include Honda, BMW, Suzuki, Aprilia, Yamaha, Kawasaki, Ducati and Triumph.

2021 CSBK Tracks

Former CSBK Tracks

Champions

External links

See also
Superbike World Championship
AMA Superbike Championship
British Superbike Championship
All Japan Road Race Championship

References

Motorsport in Canada
Motorcycle road racing series
Superbike racing
Motorcycle racing in Canada